Bokoro is a community in Mai-Ndombe of the Democratic Republic of the Congo (DRC). It is on the south bank of the Lukenie River.

Bokoro Airport is just south of the town.

References

Populated places in Mai-Ndombe Province